Rakhmanov Perevoz is a rural locality (a settlement) in Vladimir, Vladimir Oblast, Russia. The population was 49 as of 2010. There is 1 street.

Geography 
Rakhmanov Perevoz is located 12 km east of Vladimir. Ladoga is the nearest rural locality.

References 

Rural localities in Vladimir Urban Okrug